Patrick Ryan is an Irish Catholic priest who left the Pallottine order in 1973 after refusing a transfer to a parish church in England.

In 1988 Ryan was accused by British authorities of involvement in Provisional Irish Republican Army (IRA) activity, and was the subject of two unsuccessful extradition requests. Ryan denied the accusation in an interview with The Tipperary Star, saying that he had raised money both inside and outside Europe for victims on the nationalist side in the Troubles of Northern Ireland. But Ryan insisted that he had "never bought explosives for the IRA or anybody else", and had never been requested by the paramilitary group to do so. In an interview with the BBC broadcast in 2019, Ryan admitted that he was "one hundred percent" involved in IRA bomb-making.

Early life
Ryan was born in 1930 in Rossmore, County Tipperary, one of six children in a farming family. He attended the Pallotine College in Thurles, being ordained in 1954. He worked on the missions in the diocese of Mbulu in Tanzania, and also in London.

IRA activity 
On 1 May 1988, three off-duty British servicemen were killed in the Netherlands. On 30 June 1988, acting on a tip-off, Belgian police went to the home of an IRA sympathiser and arrested Ryan, who was believed to be acting as quartermaster of the IRA active service unit in Belgium. Upon his arrest, the police seized a quantity of bomb-making equipment and manuals, and a large sum of foreign currency. The British authorities provided substantial evidence in support of a request for Ryan's extradition from Belgium to face charges in Britain. Legal argument between the two countries ensued and, following a hunger strike in protest against his possible extradition to Britain, Ryan was, after a court ruling, instead deported to the Republic of Ireland.

On 30 November 1988, the European Court of Human Rights ruled that Britain was in breach of European law for permitting the detention for up to a week of people suspected of connections with terrorist groups. Prime Minister Margaret Thatcher reacted angrily to the court ruling and to Britain's failure to secure the extradition of Patrick Ryan, who was wanted on charges of helping the outlawed IRA.

Thatcher told the House of Commons: "We shall consider the judgment carefully and also the human rights of the victims and potential victims of terrorism."

Extradition demand 
Upon his transfer to Ireland, Britain formally demanded Ryan's extradition.

On 29 November 1988, Conservative MP Michael Mates called at PMQs for the immediate extradition of this "terrorist". Thatcher responded:
"The failure to secure Ryan's arrest is a matter of very grave concern to the Government. It is no use governments [of Belgium and Ireland] adopting great declarations and commitments about fighting terrorism if they then lack the resolve to put them into practice."

The next day in parliament, Labour MP Tony Benn raised with the Speaker the following point of order:
"It is clearly a misuse of privilege to use the protection of the House of Commons to make such an allegation. Father Ryan is wanted on a serious charge. It could hardly be more serious. It is in accordance with the practice of British courts that anyone charged is presumed innocent until convicted. Therefore, when a senior Member of the House says, and it is confirmed by the Prime Minister, that that person is a terrorist, it is impossible from that moment on for that man to have a fair trial. The BBC broadcast those remarks and every newspaper has highlighted them. Yesterday, the House of Commons became a lynch mob, headed by the Prime Minister, whose remarks are bound to prejudice any jury or judge if Father Ryan is brought to this country."

Michael Mates MP was the next to speak:
"Further to that point of order, Mr Speaker, I am grateful to the right hon. Member for Chesterfield (Mr Benn) for the courtesy of telling me that he was going to raise this matter. I used the phrase yesterday solely in the context of my outrage at the fact that that person was not being brought here to face trial. It was not intended to be an intimation of guilt. Strictly, I should have said, 'Ryan is the man the security forces most want in connection with serious offences.' I am happy to make that plain."

Extradition denial 
On 1 December 1988, the Attorney General, Sir Patrick Mayhew, asserted that the extradition paperwork sent to Ireland was in order and the government's claim to have Ryan extradited should be acceded to. However, Ryan said that he would rather die than face a British tribunal as he believed Irish people could never receive justice through the British legal system. The controversy was heightened by the publication of a letter in The Guardian of 7 December 1988 from a British diplomat accusing Thatcher of "double standards on terrorism" for insisting on Ryan's extradition while failing to pursue the extradition of the Coventry Four from South Africa four years earlier. The following week, amid exchanges in the House of Commons, opposition leader Neil Kinnock, said Thatcher "blew" the possibility of Ryan's extradition by her "performance." On 13 December 1988, the Irish Taoiseach, Charles Haughey, announced in Dáil Éireann that the serious charges levelled against Ryan should be investigated by a court in Ireland and, because of prejudicial remarks made in the House of Commons, Ryan could not expect to receive a fair trial in Britain.

In October 1989, the Director of Public Prosecutions in Ireland announced that he had decided not to initiate proceedings against Patrick Ryan.

1989 European election 
Ryan was the first priest to contest an election in the Republic of Ireland, when he contested the 1989 European Parliament election in the Munster constituency as an Independent with Sinn Féin support. He failed to be elected but received over 30,000 votes.

Criminal trial 
In 1993, Ryan was tried in the Special Criminal Court, on charges of receiving stolen goods and found not guilty.

BBC Spotlight interview
In a 2019 interview with the BBC, Ryan was asked if he was involved in any of the incidents of which Thatcher accused him, to which he responded "I would say most of them. One way or another, yes I had a hand in most them - yes, [Thatcher] was right". He stated that his only regret about his contribution to the Brighton hotel bombing, which killed 5 people, was that "I wasn't even more effective... I would like to have been much more effective, but we didn't do too badly".

References 

1930 births
Alumni of St. Patrick's College, Thurles
20th-century Irish Roman Catholic priests
Living people
Provisional Irish Republican Army members